Jeršanovo is a small settlement north of Velike Bloke in the Municipality of Bloke in the Inner Carniola region of Slovenia. Ecclesiastically, it is located in the parish of Sveta Trojica nad Cerknico within the Archdiocese of Ljubljana.

References

External links 
Jeršanovo on Geopedia

Populated places in the Municipality of Bloke